Datti-rajeru is a village and Mandal Headquarters in Vizianagaram district of the Indian state of Andhra Pradesh, India.

List of villages in Dattirajeru Mandal
Balabhadra Rajapuram
Bhojarajupuram
Bhupalarajapuram
Cherakupalle
China Chamalapalle
Chinakada
Chowdantivalasa
Dasupeta
Datti
Datti Rajeru
Datti Venkatapuram
Gadabavalasa
Gadasam
Gobhyam
Gutchim
Ingilapalle
Kannam
Komatipalle
Korapa
Korapa Kothavalasa
Korapakrishna Puram
Lakshmipuram
Lingarajapuram
M.Lingalavalasa
Maradam
Marrivalasa
Neelakanta Rajapuram
Pachalavalasa
Pappala Lingalavalasa
Pedakada
Pedamanapuram
Porali
S. Burjavalasa
S.Chintalavalasa
Sarayyavalasa
Shikaruganji
ST valasa
Tadendoravalasa
Timiteru
Timiteru Burjavalasa
V. Krishnapuram
Vangara
Vindhyavasi
Viziarama Gajapathi Rajapuram
Viziaramapuram

References 

Villages in Vizianagaram district
Mandal headquarters in Vizianagaram district